Polichni (literally Little town) is a suburb of the Thessaloniki Urban Area and was a former municipality in the regional unit of Thessaloniki, Greece. Since the 2011 local government reform it is part of the municipality Pavlos Melas, of which it is a municipal unit. The population is 39,332 (2011 census), and it has a land area of 7.325 km2.

The Polichni district includes the areas of:
Anthokipoi (Gardens)
Ano Polichni (Upper Polichni)
Meteora
Neromiloi (Water Mills)
St Panteleimon

The central square of Polichni is named after the Saint Panteleimon church.

External links
Official website

References

Populated places in Thessaloniki (regional unit)